Kópavogur College is an upper-secondary school in Kópavogur, Iceland, founded on September 22, 1973.

External links
MK's website
Nemendafélag Menntaskólans í Kópavogi, MK's student council website

References

Education in Iceland
Educational organizations based in Iceland
Kópavogur
Educational institutions established in 1973
1973 establishments in Iceland